The 2002 Silicon Valley Football Classic was a post-season college football bowl game between the Georgia Tech Yellow Jackets and the Fresno State Bulldogs on December 31, 2002, at Spartan Stadium in San Jose, California. Fresno State won the game 30–21; the victory was the school's first bowl victory since 1992.

References 

Georgia Tech Yellow Jackets football bowl games
Fresno State Bulldogs football bowl games
Silicon Valley Classic
Silicon Valley Football Classic